Efren Tabanas (born 31 December 1962) is a Filipino boxer. He competed in the men's flyweight event at the 1984 Summer Olympics. At the 1984 Summer Olympics, Tabanas defeated Chen King-ming of Taiwan before losing to Heo Yong-mo of South Korea. Tabanas also worked with the Cebu City Sports Commission where he helped train the local youth in boxing.

References

1962 births
Living people
Filipino male boxers
Olympic boxers of the Philippines
Boxers at the 1984 Summer Olympics
Place of birth missing (living people)
Asian Games medalists in boxing
Boxers at the 1982 Asian Games
Asian Games silver medalists for the Philippines
Medalists at the 1982 Asian Games
Southeast Asian Games medalists in boxing
Flyweight boxers